Emeka Okereke (born 1980) is a Nigerian photographer, filmmaker, writer and visual artist who lives and works in Lagos and Berlin.

Okereke is the cofounder of the Invisible Borders Trans-African Photographers Organisation.

In 2018, he received Chevalier des Arts et Lettres from the Government of France.

Education 
Emeka received a Master's from the École nationale supérieure des Beaux-Arts de Paris (The National Superior school of fine arts of Paris) in 2008.

Career 
In 2009, Okereke founded The Invisible Borders Trans-African Organisation, a collective of artists whose projects include the Invisible Borders Trans-African Road Trip and The Trans-African, a journal of African arts and visual culture.

His installation 'A Trans-African Workspace', was exhibited at the 56th Venice Biennale in 2015.

In summer of 2018, Okereke guest lectured at the Summer Academy of Fine Arts, Salzburg, Austria.

In 2018, he was awarded Chevalier De l’Ordre Des Arts et Des Lettres (Knight of the Order of Arts and Letters) from the French Government, in recognition of his significant contributions to the arts in Africa and Europe.

Selected exhibitions

Solo exhibitions 
 2018: "Exploring a Void". Salzburger Kunstverein, Salzburg Austria (Solo Exhibition)
 2008 Bagamoyo – Photography and the Useful Space / Maputo-Catembe – Maputo, Mozambique

Group exhibitions 

 2017 * Collective Thinking, For Freedoms / Aperture Foundation – New York, United States
 2017 * Collectivism. Collectives and Their Quest For Value / Amsterdam Photography Museum (Foam) – Amsterdam, Netherlands
 2018: "Whose Land Have I Lit on Now?", Savvy Contemporary Berlin
 2016 * No Borders / Gallery Dominique Fiat, – Paris, France
 2016 * Unseen Art Photo Fair / Unseen Amsterdam – Amsterdam, Netherlands
 2015 * 56th Venice Biennale / Venice Biennale – Venice, Italy

Publications 
 2018 * Countering Western Hegemony Through Trans-African Exchange
 2017 * Africulture- Le Grand Palais n’aurait pas pu être construit sans l’exploitation coloniale de l’Afrique
 2017 * ContemporaryAnd : The Neighbour-Hood Project
 2016 * Trans-Africanism: An Urban Essay in The New African Magazine
 2015 * Black Portraitures: Whose Black Is it? in Minor Literatures
 2013 * Artscape by Al Jazeera- Emeka Okereke: Invisible Borders
 2013 * Okay Africa- Emeka Okereke on Photography And a World of Possibilities

Awards and honours 
2018 – Chevalier De l’Ordre Des Arts et Des Lettres (Knight of the Order of Arts and Letters)

2016 Nominee, Prix Elysée for Photography (2016–2018)

2016 Long list nominee, Prix Pictet, 2016

2009 Artist of the Year, The Future Awards Africa

2008 Winner, Visa Pour la Creation for project "Bagamoyo", Maputo Mozambique

2004 TV5, Paris Prize for Best Photography at the Exhibition "Made in Africa", Milan Italy.

2003 Best Young Photographer of the 5th Festival of photography. Bamako, Mali.

References

External links 
 Official Website

1980 births
Living people
People from Aba, Abia
Nigerian photographers
Nigerian filmmakers
École des Beaux-Arts alumni
Nigerian male writers